Kagadi District is a district in the Western Region of Uganda.

Location
The district is bordered by Ntoroko District to the west, Hoima District to the north, Kibaale District to the east, and Kyenjojo District to the south.

Overview
The district was created on 1 July 2012 when Kibaale District was subdivided to create the current Kagadi, Kakumiro, and Kibaale districts. The district administration began to function on 1 July 2016.

References

External links
 District Online Portal

 
Bunyoro sub-region
Districts of Uganda
Western Region, Uganda